The Rivière à l'Ours is a tributary of the east bank of the Ottawa River. The Bear River crosses the unorganized territory Les Lacs-du-Témiscamingue, in the Témiscamingue Regional County Municipality, in the administrative region of Abitibi-Témiscamingue, in the province of Quebec, in Canada.

From the second half of 19th century, forestry was the predominant economic activity in the sector.

Geography 

The watersheds neighbors of the Bear River are:

 north side: Montégron lake, Fildegrand River;
 east side: Buchoitz River, Petite rivière à l'Ours, Fildegrand River, Buchoitz Lake, Sunday Lake, Hart Lake, Small Lake Bear;
 south side: Ottawa River;
 west side: Lake Saint-Cirque, outlet of Lake Saint-Cirque.

An unnamed lake constitutes the head of the Bear River. This body of water is located west of Bois Franc Lake, south of Tom Lake and at south of Lake Montégron.

The last  segment of the river has several rapids. The river pours into the bottom of a bay on the east shore of Holden Lake which is crossed by the Ottawa River.

Toponymy 

Animals are used frequently in French Canadian toponymy. The bear is an animal respected for its character and its strength. Its meat is edible. Its bones (after having cut or sharpened them) can be used to make tools (eg scrapers) or weapons. Its skin can be used in particular for clothing, bags, blanket, carpet or shelter. The bear is the subject of several legends, generally of Aboriginal origin.

The toponym Rivière à l'Ours is associated with the neighboring watercourse (east side) which is designated Little Bear River and with the neighboring lake (east side) designated Petit lac à l'Ours.

The toponym Rivière à l'Ours was formalized on December 5, 1968 at the Place Names Bank of the Commission de toponymie du Québec.

See also 

 List of rivers of Quebec

Notes and references 

Rivers of Abitibi-Témiscamingue